St Joseph High School, founded in 1962, is a self-governing institution within the Roman Catholic Diocese of Bridgeport in Trumbull, Connecticut. It is a co-ed school of approximately 830 students.

History 
Founded in 1962, St Joseph High School was run by the Marist Brothers and the School Sisters of Notre Dame. The following individuals have served as principals: Brother Edward Caffrey, Monsignor Richard Shea, Richard Bishop, Matthew Kenney, Kenneth Mayo, James P. Keane, and Nancy DiBuono (current principal).

Catholic identity 
St Joseph High School offers Mass each day in the Alumni Chapel located on campus. The school also boasts a full-time Chaplain, Fr. Eric Silva. All students of St Joseph High School, regardless of religion, are required to take Catholic religion classes all 4 years.

Service 
St Joseph High School students are required to complete community service: 10 hours freshman year, 15 hours sophomore year, 20 hours junior year, 25 hours senior year.

Athletics 
St Joseph High School is part of the Fairfield County Interscholastic Athletic Conference (FCIAC). The school fields 49 teams in 19 sports, including cheerleading, cross country, field hockey, football, soccer, swimming and diving, volleyball, basketball, bowling, ice hockey, indoor track, wrestling, baseball, golf, lacrosse, outdoor track, softball, and tennis. The school also participates in co-op Teams with Trumbull High School for swimming and diving, ice hockey, and gymnastics. Since 1975, SJ athletic teams and individuals have won more than 100 championships.

In 2019, the St Joseph High School varsity football team became the first team to win three different class championships (Class S, Class M, Class L) in three consecutive years.

In 2021, the St Joseph High School boys varsity golf team won both the Division III state championship during the spring season and the Division II state championship during the fall season after the state boys golf schedule was reorganized.

Notable alumni 

Matthew Batten, Second Baseman for San Diego Padres
Julia Marino, professional snowboarder, Member of 2018 USA Winter Olympic team, 5x Winter X Games Medalist
Tyler Matakevich, Linebacker for Buffalo Bills - Former AP All-American for the Temple Owls, winner of the Nagurski and Bednarik awards.
Kevin Nealon, actor/comedian
Christy Carlson Romano, actress
Lisa Lampanelli, comedienne/actress/motivational speaker

References

External links 
 
 Roman Catholic Diocese of Bridgeport

Buildings and structures in Trumbull, Connecticut
Roman Catholic Diocese of Bridgeport
Schools in Fairfield County, Connecticut
Educational institutions established in 1962
Catholic secondary schools in Connecticut
1962 establishments in Connecticut